Mary E. Costanza (born February 21, 1937) is a retired doctor and professor at the University of Massachusetts Amherst medical school. She is known for her research in the field of cancer, cancer prevention, and leadership of the American Cancer Society in Massachusetts.

Education and career
Costanza has a B.A. from Radcliffe College (1958), an M.A. from the University of California, Berkeley (1963), and an M.D. from the University of Rochester School of Medicine (1968). She did an internship and residency in medicine at Tufts- New England Medical Center where she continued on to be a clinical fellow. Starting in 1970 she volunteered at a health clinic in Somerville, Massachusetts, an activity she retained until 1980. From 1980 until 1990 she was the director of oncology at the University of Massachusetts and its associated hospital. Starting in 1990 she led the High Risk Breast Cancer Clinic. She was a visiting scientist at the Dana-Farber Cancer Institute from 1989 to 1990. In 1995 she was named president of the Massachusetts American Cancer Society.

Research 
Costanza's early research was on the carcinoembryonic antigen as a screening tool for cancer. Her subsequent research compared outcomes of patients receiving different chemotherapy drug regimes and toxic effects from cancer drugs. Costanza has shared the pros and cons of different drug regimes used for breast cancer in The New York Times. Her later work centered on raising public awareness of breast cancer and working to improve implementation of screening for breast cancer, including large-scale studies on new drugs for prevention of breast cancer and the connection between weight and prevalence of breast cancer in women. She has researched the benefit of reminding women about the need for regular mammograms, and screening for colorectal cancer and prostate cancer.

Selected publications

Personal life 
In 1994 Costanza was diagnosed with breast cancer and spoke with The Boston Globe about her personal decisions while being a patient.

References 

Living people
Radcliffe College alumni
University of California, Berkeley alumni
University of Rochester alumni
Women medical researchers
Women physicians
1937 births